Cephalomanes atrovirens is a species of fern in the family Hymenophyllaceae. The genus Cephalomanes is accepted in the Pteridophyte Phylogeny Group classification of 2016 (PPG I), but not by some other sources. , Plants of the World Online sank the genus into a broadly defined Trichomanes, while treating the subtaxa of this species as the separate species Trichomanes acrosorum, Trichomanes atrovirens, Trichomanes boryanum  and Trichomanes kingii.

Subtaxa
Two subspecies and two forms have been recognized, all of which have been recognized as separate species in the genus Trichomanes by other sources:
Cephalomanes atrovirens ssp. atrovirens, syn. Trichomanes atrovirens (C.Presl) Kunze
Other synonyms:
Cephalomanes rhomboideum J.Sm. ex Bosch
Trichomanes rhomboideum J.Sm.
Cephalomanes atrovirens ssp. boryanum (Kunze) K.Iwats., syn. Trichomanes boryanum Kunze
Other synonyms:
Cephalomanes alatum C.Presl
Cephalomanes australicum Bosch
Cephalomanes boryanum (Kunze) Bosch
Cephalomanes wilkesii Bosch
Lacostea boryana Prantl
Trichomanes alatum Bory
Trichomanes australicum (Bosch) Copel.
Trichomanes javanicum var. boryanum (Kunze) Fosberg
Cephalomanes atrovirens f. acrosorum (Copel.) K.Iwats., syn. Trichomanes acrosorum Copel.
Other synonyms:
Cephalomanes acrosorum (Copel.) Copel.
Cephalomanes atrovirens f. kingii (Copel.) K.Iwats., syn. Trichomanes kingii Copel.
Other synonyms:
Cephalomanes kingii (Copel.) Copel.

Distribution
The species as a whole is native to the Ryukyu Islands, Malesia (the Philippines and Sulawesi), Papuasia (New Guinea, the Bismarck Archipelago, and the Solomon Islands), the northwestern Pacific (the Mariana Islands, Palau, the Caroline Islands, and the Federated States of Micronesia), the southwestern Pacific (Fiji, Samoa, Tonga, the Santa Cruz Islands, and Vanuatu) and eastern Australia (Queensland, New South Wales, Norfolk Island, and Lord Howe Island).

The two subspecies recognized by the Checklist of Ferns and Lycophytes of the World have distinct distributions. C. atrovirens subsp. atrovirens is native to the Ryukyu Islands, eastern tropical Asia (New Guinea, the Philippines, the Santa Cruz Islands, the Solomon Islands, Sulawesi, Vanuatu) and eastern Australia (Queensland, New South Wales, Norfolk Island and Lord Howe Island). C. atrovirens subsp. boryanum is found further east, being native to New Guinea, the Bismarck Archipelago and islands of the western Pacific (the Caroline Islands, Fiji, the Mariana Islands, Samoa, Tonga, and Vanuatu).

The two forms have a narrower distribution. Both are found in New Guinea. C. atrovirens f. acrosorum is also native to Micronesia and the Solomon Islands, whereas C. atrovirens f. kingii is also native to the Santa Cruz Islands.

References

Hymenophyllales
Flora of the Ryukyu Islands
Flora of the Philippines
Flora of Sulawesi
Flora of New Guinea
Flora of the Bismarck Archipelago
Flora of the Solomon Islands (archipelago)
Flora of Fiji
Flora of Samoa
Flora of the Santa Cruz Islands
Flora of Tonga
Flora of Vanuatu
Flora of the Mariana Islands
Flora of Palau
Flora of the Caroline Islands
Flora of the Federated States of Micronesia
Flora of Lord Howe Island
Flora of New South Wales
Flora of Norfolk Island
Flora of Queensland